Patrick O' Sullivan (20 January 1835 – 25 February 1887) was a British lawyer of Irish origin who served as the Advocate-General of Madras Presidency and ex-officio member of the Madras Legislative Council from 1877 to 1882.

He studied law at Gray's Inn and was called to the bar in 1864.

He married Sidney Jane Moore in India. They had an only son, Arthur, a British Army officer who played a leading role in the 1914 Christmas truce.

References 

 

1835 births
1887 deaths
Members of Gray's Inn
Members of the Madras Legislative Council
Advocates General for Tamil Nadu
19th-century British lawyers